Li Bai (701–762) was a famous Chinese poet of the Tang dynasty.

Li Bai may also refer to:

 Li Bai (spy) (1910–1949), a spy of the Chinese Communist Party
 Lilian Lee (born 1959), original name Li Bai, Hong Kong writer 
 James Riady (born 1957), Chinese-Indonesian businessman
 Li Zongren and Bai Chongxi, powerful partners in Chinese politics and military affairs in the earlier 20th century